Moreno Beretta (born 28 May 1993) is an Italian professional footballer who plays as a forward.

Career
Born in Santa Margherita of Liguria region, Beretta started his career at the city of Genoa, the capital of Liguria for U.C. Sampdoria. In 2012, he left the reserve team for Lega Pro Prima Divisione club Portogruaro, along with Edoardo Blondett, Andrea Magrassi, Alessandro Martinelli, Andrea Tozzo and Giuseppe Zampano in temporary deal, on 2 August 2012. On 31 January 2013 Beretta left for fellow third division club Virtus Entella. On 13 July 2013 Beretta remained in the third division for Paganese. On 28 January 2014 he was signed by San Marino with option to renew the loan. The Sanmarinese club finished as the second from the bottom of Group A. However, due to the merger of the two divisions of Lega Pro (ex–Serie C), no teams would be relegated from Lega Pro Prima Divisione to Serie D in 2014, except Nocerina due to sports fraud.

On 12 July 2014 he was released by Sampdoria. On 6 October 2014 he was signed by Pisa.

In summer 2015 he was signed by Mantova. On 15 July 2016 he was released.

References

External links
 AIC profile (data by football.it) 

Italian footballers
U.C. Sampdoria players
A.S.D. Portogruaro players
Virtus Entella players
Paganese Calcio 1926 players
A.S.D. Victor San Marino players
Pisa S.C. players
Mantova 1911 players
Serie C players
Italy youth international footballers
Association football forwards
Sportspeople from the Province of Genoa
1993 births
Living people
People from Santa Margherita Ligure
Footballers from Liguria